Uncle Bräsig (German: Onkel Bräsig) is a West German period drama television series which first aired on ARD between 1978 and 1980. It is based on the novel From My Farming Days by Fritz Reuter, which had previously been made into the 1936 film Uncle Bräsig. It is set in Mecklenburg in the 1840s.

Partial cast
 Fritz Hollenbeck as Onkel Bräsig
 Robert Zimmerling as Karl Havermann
 Uwe Dallmeier as  Jochen Nüßler
 Helga Feddersen as Frau Pomuchelskopp
 Claus Jahncke as Fritz Triddelfitz
 Alexander Radszun as Franz von Rambow
 Joachim Wolff as Pomuchelskopp

References

Bibliography
 Jovan Evermann. Der Serien-Guide: M-S. Schwarzkopf & Schwarzkopf, 1999.

External links
 

1978 German television series debuts
1980 German television series endings
1970s drama television series
1980s drama television series
German-language television shows